Something Wrong is the second album released by the pop/electro band Bang Gang. It was written by Barði Jóhannson and released in 2003.

Track listing

Musicians
 Barði Jóhannson - guitar, vocals
 Esther Talia Casey - vocals

2003 albums
Bang Gang albums